Hardingstone is a village in Northamptonshire, England. It is on the southern edge of Northampton, and now forms a suburb of the town. The Newport Pagnell road (the B526, formerly part of the A50) separates the village from the nearby village of Wootton, which has also been absorbed into the urban area.

The villages name means 'Hearding's Thorn-tree'.

Governance
As a  village distinct from the town it has its own parish council, unlike more recent 20th and 21st century suburbs of the town.  The parish includes part of the Brackmills Industrial Estate, and borders Delapré Abbey.

Demographics
The 2001 census showed there were 2,015 people living in the parish: 978 males and 1,037 females in 885 households. The 2011 census showed a very minor reduction to 2,014.

Brackmills
To the north-east of the village is the large Brackmills Industrial Estate. The estate was chosen as the site of a 400 ft wind turbine erected by the Asda supermarket chain at one of their warehouses, but this was rejected by the planners.

Facilities
The original village school was built around 1860-70 by General Bouverie; this building remained open until the 1960s or 70s when the primary school was transferred to a more modern building in Martin's Lane, and the old school was transferred to Northampton County Council (Social Services) who now let it to the Hardingstone Village Hall Association.

The village has two pubs: "The Crown" and "The Sun" along with a post office, supermarket and several hairdressers.

Queen Eleanor's Cross
On the edge of the village, on the road going into Northampton, can be found one of only three remaining Eleanor crosses.
The cross commemorates the resting at nearby Delapré Abbey of the body of Queen Eleanor of Castile; King Edward I stayed at nearby Northampton Castle. The cross was begun in 1291 by John of Battle; he worked with William of Ireland to carve the statues; William was paid five marks (£3 6s. 8d. or £3.33) per figure.

The cross is octagonal and set on some steps, the present ones being replacements. The cross is built in three tiers and originally had a crowning terminal – possibly a cross. It is not known when this was lost, but it had been lost by the time of the second Battle of Northampton in 1460. Its bottom tier features open books; these probably included painted inscriptions of Eleanor's biography and of prayers for her soul to be said by viewers, which are now lost.

The cross is referred to in Daniel Defoe's A tour thro' the whole island of Great Britain, where he reports on the Great Fire of Northampton in 1675:
... a townsman being at Queen's Cross upon a hill on the south side of the town, about two miles off, saw the fire at one end of the town then newly begun, and that before he could get to the town it was burning at the remotest end, opposite where he first saw it.

Restoration work was completed in 2019.

Church

The parish church of St Edmund dates back to the 12th century and is mentioned in documents from 1107.  Nikolaus Pevsner considered that the body of the church had been over-restored.

Many members of the Bouverie family (owners of nearby Delapré Abbey) are buried in the vault. The family used this as their family church because the Abbey, after the Dissolution of the Monasteries, lacked its own chapel.

During the Second World War the stained glass windows were removed for safety but afterwards could not be found. Some people believe that they might be in the Bouverie family vault, but this is bricked up and the mystery remains.

Iron Ore Quarries 
Iron ore quarrying began at Hardingstone in about 1852. It is likely that quarrying had ceased by 1860. The quarry was to the east of the old village area and to the north of the Bedford Road. Part of it has had houses built on it and Landimore Road now crosses the site as well as a footpath. Traces of the quarry are visible. The ore was taken away by a tramway leading to the Northampton to Peterborough railway line (now closed.) It is likely that the upper part of the tramway was worked by a stationary steam engine. Part of the route of the tramway has been built over and part (near to the railway) has been dug up by gravel workings or flood prevention works and flooded.

There were later workings in the Far Cotton part of the old Hardingstone Parish. Further details can be found on the Far Cotton page.

Alfred Rouse
Hardingstone Lane was the scene of the Blazing car murder of 1931 which attracted sensational national interest. The felon, Alfred Rouse, was tried at Northampton Assizes and subsequently hanged in Bedford Gaol on 10 March 1931. The male victim has never been identified and was buried at Hardingstone church. In January 2014, it was revealed that DNA had been found in the Northamptonshire 'blazing car' murder case and the identity of the victim might at last be found. However, the family who feared for more than 80 years that their relative was the victim were told by scientists the victim's DNA did not match theirs. In October 2014, scientists trying to identify the murder victim said they were down to nine strong leads. In December 2014, Dr John Bond, forensic science expert at the University of Leicester, said he would look into the possibility of a Mr Brick from Wales being the victim of Rouse.

Notable residents
 Robert Adams (sculptor and designer)
 Thomas Croxen Archer (1817-1885), botanist, and first Director of the National Museum of Scotland

References

External links

Pevsner - The Buildings of England - Northamptonshire. 
Northamptonshire County Council
Hardingstone Parish Council
Hardingstone Village Hall

Areas of Northampton
Villages in Northamptonshire
Civil parishes in Northamptonshire